Kim Won-hee (born June 9, 1972) is a South Korean television presenter and actress. She began her career in acting, starring in television series such as Queen (1999), The Thief's Daughter (2000), Love Needs a Miracle (2005) and Don't Ask Me About the Past (2008), as well as the films Oh! LaLa Sisters (2002), Marrying the Mafia II (2005), Marrying the Mafia III (2006) and Swindler in My Mom's House (2007). In recent years, Kim has become more active with variety and talk shows, notably Come to Play which she and Yoo Jae-suk hosted for eight years.

Filmography

Film

Television series

Variety/radio show

Awards and nominations

References

External links 
  
 
 Kim Won-hee Fan Cafe at Daum 
 
 
 

1972 births
Living people
FNC Entertainment artists
South Korean television personalities
South Korean television actresses
South Korean film actresses
People from Seoul
Best Variety Performer Female Paeksang Arts Award (television) winners